Longitude is a geographic coordinate that specifies the east–west position of a point on the Earth's surface, or the surface of a celestial body. 

Longitude may also refer to:
 Longitude rewards, a British inducement prize for a solution to the longitude problem  
 Longitude, a book by Dava Sobel about John Harrison
 Longitude, a 2000 TV drama produced from the book
 Longitude Prize, an inducement prize contest inspired from the longitude rewards
 Cessna Citation Longitude, a business jet
 Longitude Festival, an annual music festival in Dublin, Ireland
 Longitude LLC, a private business in para-mutual betting technology